Edenfest was 3-day concert that took place July 12–14, 1996 at Mosport Park, in Bowmanville, Ontario, Canada.

The concert sold over 70,000 tickets total for the 3 day event and was attended by another estimated 20,000 people who walked into the concert site after the outside security broke down. This festival that included music as well as multiple other types of performers was held by Eden Entertainment Group based in Buffalo, New York. The concert was one of the first major concerts to be streamed live over the internet. This event was the largest rock festival held in Canada to date. Artists that performed include The Tragically Hip, The Cure, Porno for Pyros, Bush, Live, the Goo Goo Dolls, Ani DiFranco and over 50 other performers. The event was considered a creative success; however, the promoter of the event, Mark Drost, was plagued with financial problems due to several forces beyond his control, including the security breakdown. Edenfest was scheduled to go on for 10 consecutive years at the Mosport site; the promoter was unfortunately bankrupted by the event, and thus, it did not continue past 1996.

Band List

Friday, July 12

Main Stage
 The Refreshments
 Lustre
 Glueleg
 Poe
 Spirit of the West
 The Nixons
 7 Mary 3
 Sloan
 Bush
 The Cure

Second Stage
 The Tails
 Lenni Jabour
 Son
 The Bogmen
 Starkicker
 Merlin
 Lotion
 Shed 7
 Stabbing Westward
 Gravity Kills

Saturday, July 13
Main Stage
Elk
Tracy Bonham
Spacehog
Everclear
Odds
Love & Rockets
Porno For Pyros
Live
The Tragically Hip

Second Stage
Hoarse
Supergarage
Hell Billys
Muse (note: not the English rock band of the same name est. 1994; the English band was not yet touring internationally in 1996)
Ruth Ruth
7 Year Bitch
Letters to Cleo
Solution A.D.
Screamin' Cheetah Wheelies
Skydiggers
Blinker the Star
Buzzcocks

Sunday, July 14
Main Stage
Doughboys
James Hall
Spin Doctors
The Mighty Mighty Bosstones
Howard Jones (English musician)
Goo Goo Dolls
Catherine Wheel
The Watchmen
Ani DiFranco

Second Stage
The Femmes
Jenny Anykind
Rain Still Falls
The Gufs
Blinker the Star
Holly McNarland
Pluto
The Gandharvas
hHead
Universal Honey

References

External links
 Official Site

1996 in Canada
1996 music festivals
Rock festivals in Canada
Music festivals in Ontario
Clarington
Cancelled music festivals